This is a list of state symbols of the State of Tamil Nadu in India. The state was formed on 1 November 1956, but its emblem was adapted in 1949. A state flag proposed in 1970 by the Government of Tamil Nadu was not officially adopted. Instead, a banner bearing the image of the state's emblem is used to represent the government. The song of Invocation to Goddess Tamil written by Manonmaniam Sundaram Pillai

State symbols

Flora and fauna

Culture

See also
List of Indian state symbols
Emblems of Indian States

References

Symbols
Tamil Nadu
Symbols